John Joseph "Jos" Sances (born August 18, 1952) is an American artist, activist, writer, and community organizer, known for his printmaking, and tile murals/public art . He is the founder and director of Alliance Graphics. Sances is based in Berkeley, California.

Biography 
John Joseph Sances was born August 18, 1952 in Boston, Massachusetts to a Sicilian-American family. He studied at Montserrat School of Visual Arts (now Montserrat College of Art). 

He came to California in 1976 and became active in art and politics. In the last 1970s, Sance was active with the Galería de la Raza and the La Raza Silkscreen Center. In c.1982, Sances co-founded Mission Grafica at the Mission Cultural Center for Latino Arts. 

In 1989, Sances founded the Alliance Graphics, a Berkeley-based union screen print shop. Profits from Alliance Graphics support the parent organization, the Middle East Children's Alliance (MECA).

His work, Or, The Whale (2019) was in the 2019 exhibition, Here is the Sea at Richmond Art Center. The Or, The Whale work was created on 119 panels, when assembled together they form a 14 feet high by 51 long scratchboard with the image of a sperm whale with the illustrated history of capitalism in America inside of the whale.

Sances is a member of the food-based art group The Great Tortilla Conspiracy making tortilla art, other members include Rio Yañez, René Yañez, and Art Hazelwood.

Sances' work can be found in various public museum collections, including Smithsonian American Art Museum, Birmingham Museum of Art, American Labor Museum in Haledon, New Jersey, Oakland Museum of California (OMCA), Fine Arts Museums of San Francisco, among others.

Sances' screenprints, his own images and images printed for other artists, are included in Mission Grafica: Reflecting a Community in Print.

Murals

References 

1952 births
Artists from Berkeley, California
Montserrat College of Art alumni
Hispanic and Latino American artists
American people of Italian descent
Living people